Phaeogenes is a genus of parasitoid wasps belonging to the family Ichneumonidae.

The species of this genus are found in Eurasia and Northern America.

Species:
 Phaeogenes acaudus (Provancher, 1882) 
 Phaeogenes alternans Wesmael, 1845

References

Ichneumonidae
Ichneumonidae genera